Wrayanna is a genus of minute, salt marsh snails with an operculum, aquatic gastropod mollusks, or micromollusks, in the family Assimineidae.

Species
Species in the genus Wrayanna include: 
 Wrayanna soluta

References

 
Assimineidae
Taxonomy articles created by Polbot